Klaus Huber (born 1968) is a retired Austrian ski jumper.

In the World Cup he finished twice among the top 10, his best result being a seventh place from Tauplitz in February 1991.

He finished third overall in the 1993-1994 Continental Cup.

External links

1968 births
Living people
Austrian male ski jumpers